Venaus is a comune (municipality) in Cenischia Valley (Metropolitan City of Turin) in the Italian region Piedmont, located about 50 km west of Turin, on the border with France.

Venaus borders the following municipalities: Bramans (France), Giaglione, Lanslebourg-Mont-Cenis (France), Mompantero, Moncenisio, and Novalesa.

References

Cities and towns in Piedmont